Md Ruhul Amin (born 1956) is a Bangladeshi politician and was a Member of Parliament from Kurigram-4 on 10th parliament.

Early life
Amin was born on 11 February 1956. He studied up to S.S.C. or grade ten.

Career
Amin was elected to Parliament from Kurigram-4 as a Jatiya Party candidate in 2014 and served till 2018.

References

Living people
10th Jatiya Sangsad members
1956 births
Jatiya Party politicians